The State University metro station is situated on Saburtalo Line in Tbilisi, Georgia. It is the western terminus of the Saburtalo Line.

Construction of the State University station began in 1985, but ceased due to financial difficulties in 1994 and conserved in 2000. The station was completed between 2015 and 2017 with the help of the Asian Development Bank. It was opened on 16 October 2017. Shortly after opening, in January of 2018, Siemens fitted a modern signaling system which covers 2.6km of track  which stretches from Delisi to State University (Tbilisi Metro) and electronically controls all the interlockings on this segment, which includes State University.

See also
 List of Tbilisi metro stations

References

Railway stations opened in 2017
Tbilisi Metro stations
2017 establishments in Georgia (country)